Novosafarovo (Yañı Safar) is a rural locality (a village) in Uryadinsky Selsoviet, Mishkinsky District, Bashkortostan, Russia. The population was 21 as of 2010. There are 4 streets.

Geography 
Novosafarovo is located 29 km south of Mishkino (the district's administrative centre) by road. Yanagushevo is the nearest rural locality.

References 

Rural localities in Mishkinsky District